Club Disco is the fifth studio album by Australian singer Dannii Minogue. It was released by All Around the World digitally on 5 November 2007 worldwide. It was also re-released in Australia on 27 May 2008 physically with the single "Touch Me Like That", and a bonus disc of club remixes. The album is heavily inspired by 1980s disco. Six singles were released from the album—"You Won't Forget About Me", "Perfection", "So Under Pressure", "I Can't Sleep at Night", "He's the Greatest Dancer" and "Touch Me Like That"—five of which reached number one on the UK Dance Chart.

Album background
After the success of her previous album Neon Nights, Minogue was asked by All Around the World Records, a major dance label, if she would write the lyrics to a popular dance instrumental track called "Flower Power", which was a huge hit in clubs in Ibiza. Minogue agreed and wrote the lyrics to the song that would soon become "You Won't Forget About Me". About writing lyrics for the song, Minogue said: "I'd heard it without vocals and I thought, 'Fantastic'. I had already written loads of vocals for myself and knew I had something that would be perfect for it."

By 2005 sessions were well underway with Minogue writing and recording material with longtime collaborators Thriller Jill, J.C.A, who wrote her hit "I Begin to Wonder", and Roger Sanchez on the track "Do You Believe Me Now?" Sessions with The Location, Rob Davis, Jewels & Stone, and The Fourty4s also took place. The album took on the working title of Heavy Disco during this time after the line in the J.C.A.-produced "Feel Like I Do". In early 2005, The Location-produced "Love Fight" was considered for single release, before "I Can't Sleep at Night" was decided upon. The song received a video and remix treatment before being delayed in favour of a new collaboration with the Soul Seekerz on their instrumental track "Turn Me Upside Down". As a result, "Perfection" was released in October 2005 as the album's second single, becoming a dance hit and reaching number one on the UK Dance Chart.

During this time, All Around the World decided to release a hits compilation to support the upcoming album and Minogue's success on the dance music scene. In 2006, Minogue continued writing and recording material with British dance group LMC. During one of their sessions, they penned "So Under Pressure", which was inspired by the cancer diagnoses of her sister Kylie Minogue as well as that of an unnamed friend. Minogue has described the recording of "So Under Pressure" as a "real achievement" as she was "brave enough to put all [her feelings] into words". This song was used to launch the compilation The Hits & Beyond, which included fifteen previously released singles as well as some of the new material as a taster. One of these 'beyond' tracks was "I Can't Sleep at Night", which was released to digital retail outlets as the fourth single in January 2007.

At this time Minogue also recorded a cover of "He's the Greatest Dancer" as the charity single for that year's Children in Need; it was dropped when Minogue pulled out of Strictly Come Dancing to work on rival TV show The X Factor. The single was replaced in favour of a cover of "Downtown" former Spice Girl Emma Bunton had performed. In December 2006, the track was released to dance clubs in the United Kingdom. It was physically released in Australia by Central Station Records on 14 April 2007, with the UK only receiving a digital release. It was ultimately featured on the album along with another cover track, "Xanadu", which was initially recorded for a Departure Lounge compilation series.

The album, retitled Club Disco a reference to Minogue's hypocorism, "Disco", finally saw a release on 5 November 2007. It was initially only released to online music stores. In an interview Minogue stated the decision to release the album digitally, saying, "I'm always on the internet buying music so I always want to make it something good". The following month a collaboration with Jason Nevins, "Touch Me Like That", was released as a single. In 2008, Central Station, Minogue's Australian label, re-released the album physically featuring "Touch Me Like That", along with a bonus disc of club remixes.

Track listing

"Do You Believe Me Now?" is not included on the Australian edition and "Touch Me Like That" is included instead as the opening track with the rest of the songs following.

Australian bonus remix disc
 "Touch Me Like That" with Jason Nevins (Stonebridge Club Mix)
 "He's the Greatest Dancer" (Shapeshifters Remix)
 "Perfection" with Soul Seekerz (Seamus Haji & Paul Emmanuel Remix)
 "So Under Pressure" (Soul Seekerz Extended)
 "You Won't Forget About Me" with Flower Power (Discode Club Mix)
 "I Can't Sleep at Night" (Kenny Hayes Sunshine Funk Mix)
 "Touch Me Like That" with Jason Nevins (Space Cowboy Remix)
 "He's the Greatest Dancer" (Riffs & Rays Remix)
 "Perfection" with Soul Seekerz (Koishii & Hush Remix)
 "So Under Pressure" (Steve Pitron Remix)

Australian iTunes bonus track
"Do You Believe Me Now?" with Roger Sanchez

Bonus footage
All bonus footage appears on the 7digital bundle version of Club Disco.
 "So Under Pressure" (music video)
 "I Can't Sleep at Night" (music video)
 "Perfection" (music video)
 "You Won't Forget About Me" (music video)

Personnel
 Central Station Records – artwork
 Cody Burridge – photography
 Andrew Hobbs – additional photography
 Lee Monteverde – producer (tracks 7, 8, 11)
 Rob Davis – producer (tracks 10, 12, 13)
 Thriller Jill – producer (tracks 14, 15, 16)

Charts

Release history

References

2007 albums
Dannii Minogue albums